United We Stand is a novel by the Canadian author Eric Walters, and is the sequel to the award-winning book We All Fall Down. The story begins on the day after the first book ends, September 12, 2001.

External links
 Eric Walters website

Novels by Eric Walters
2009 Canadian novels